Cowers Lane is a settlement in Derbyshire bordering Shottle near Belper, Derbyshire England along the A517 road.
In Norman times, Shottle Park was one of the seven parks within Duffield Frith.

It was the site of a large shelter for cattle belonging to the Duchy of Lancaster who owned the Frith. It is generally believed that the name is the local dialect equivalent of "Cow House Lane".

References

 

Hamlets in Derbyshire
Towns and villages of the Peak District
Geography of Amber Valley